The Paul and Madeleine Weidlinger House, also known simply as the Weidlinger House, is a historic house at 54 Valley Road in Wellfleet, Massachusetts.  It is one of a modest number of surviving houses in Wellfleet that combine elements of Modern architecture with traditional Cape Cod architecture.  The single story wood-frame house was built in 1954 by designer Paul Weidlinger (founder of Weidlinger Associates, a design firm) for his family's use.  It is located on a steep grade overlooking Higgins Pond, with one end projecting over the grade.  A deck wraps around three sides of the house, and large glass doors give views of the surrounding landscape.  The house, which is within the bounds of the Cape Cod National Seashore, was donated to the National Park Service in 1973 by Madeleine Weidlinger.  The house is the subject of a 2012 lease agreement between the Park Service and the Cape Cod Modern House Trust.

The house was listed on the National Register of Historic Places in 2014.

See also
National Register of Historic Places listings in Barnstable County, Massachusetts
National Register of Historic Places listings in Cape Cod National Seashore

References

Houses in Barnstable County, Massachusetts
Wellfleet, Massachusetts
Modernist architecture in Massachusetts
National Register of Historic Places in Cape Cod National Seashore
Houses completed in 1954
Houses on the National Register of Historic Places in Barnstable County, Massachusetts